Jalisco is a genus of dung beetles in the subfamily Aphodiinae. There is one described species, Jalisco plumipes known from Jalisco, Mexico.

References

Scarabaeidae
Beetles described in 2003
Fauna of Mexico